is a passenger railway station located in the city of Iyo, Ehime Prefecture, Japan. It is operated by JR Shikoku and has the station number "S09".

The station has been featured on the Seishun 18 Ticket promotional poster 3 times, making it very popular with photographers and tourists.

Lines
It is located on the older, original branch of the line which runs along the coast of the Seto Inland Sea. Connections with other services are needed to travel further east of Matsuyama on the line. The tourist train Iyonada Monogatari runs on the coastal branch and makes a stop at Shimonada to allow passengers to take in and photograph the scenic views. One train times its arrival at sunset to catch the view of setting sun over the Seto Inland Sea. However passengers do not leave the train at this station and no new passengers are taken on.

Layout
The station consists of a side platform serving a single track. An unstaffed station building serves as a waiting room. A ramp leads to the platform where a shelter is provided. There are traces of a track bed on the other side of the platform, indicating that it was once an island serving two tracks.

History
At that time the station was operated by Japanese Government Railways (JGR), later becoming Japanese National Railways (JNR). With the privatization of JNR on 1 April 1987, control of the station passed to JR Shikoku.

Surrounding area
 Iyo City Hall Shimonada Branch
 Iyo Municipal Shimonada Elementary School

See also
 List of railway stations in Japan

References

External links
Station timetable

Railway stations in Ehime Prefecture
Railway stations in Japan opened in 1935
Iyo, Ehime